Herman Pines (January 17, 1902 – April 10, 1996) was a Russian Empire-born American chemist. Born in Łódź—then part of the Russian Empire—he left his hometown as a young man as Jewish quotas and other anti-Jewish practices prevented Jewish students from attending university. After earning a degree in chemical engineering at the École Supérieure de Chimie Industrielle de Lyon in France, he worked at Universal Oil Products (now UOP LLC) from 1930 to 1952. Pines also worked at Northwestern University beginning in 1941, and served from 1953–1970 as the Ipatieff Research Professor of Chemistry and Director of the Ipatieff High Pressure and Catalytic Laboratory.

He is best known for his work with Vladimir Ipatieff on the catalytic conversion of high-octane aviation fuel, which was made available to the Royal Air Force during World War II, helping them win the Battle of Britain. Because of his scientific contributions, new processes were developed for the isomerization of paraffins, the alkylation of aromatic compounds, and base-catalyzed organic reactions.

Biography
Herman Pines was born on January 17, 1902, to Isaac and Eugenia (Grynfeld) Pines, a Jewish couple in  Łódź (then in the Russian Empire, now Poland). Pines left Łódź as a young man, because Jewish quotas and other anti-Jewish practices prevented Jewish students from attending university.
Instead Pines went to France to study. In 1927, Pines received a degree in chemical engineering at the École Supérieure de Chimie Industrielle de Lyon (now the École Supérieure de Chimie Physique Électronique de Lyon).

In 1928 Pines emigrated to the United States. 
After working at routine jobs for a couple of years, he joined Universal Oil Products (now UOP LLC) in McCook, Illinois, in 1930. He began by doing routine analyses, and was later transferred to the research department. 
By 1930 Pines was a doctoral student at the University of Chicago, and working at UOP.  
There he met Russian-born Vladimir Ipatieff. Pines became his assistant, beginning a twenty-two-year scientific collaboration.
Initially, the two expatriates used French and Russian as working languages, since they spoke both of them better than English.

Studying at night, Pines completed a Ph.D in organic chemistry at the University of Chicago in 1935 with the thesis A study of the electronegativities of organic radicals. 
In 1941, Pines received a part-time research professorship at Northwestern University in Evanston, Illinois. He continued to work for UOP, serving as OUP's full-time Coordinator of Exploratory Research from 1945 to 1951.

After the death of Ipatieff in 1952, Pines left UOP to focus on his work at Northwestern University. In 1953 he became the Ipatieff Research Professor of Chemistry and Director of the Ipatieff High Pressure and Catalytic Laboratory. Pines retired from the position in 1970, but continued to be scientifically active as a professor emeritus until a few months before his death on April 10, 1996.

Pines greatly appreciated the willingness of the United States to welcome refugees.

Family
Pines married Dorothy Mlotek in 1927. They had a daughter, Judith or Judy (Pines) Suessmeier. 
Pines' mother, brothers and uncle, as well as other members of his family were killed during The Holocaust.

Work
Pines and Ipatieff worked closely together for 22 years, until Ipatieff died and Pines succeeded him at Northwestern University. A modest man who tended to emphasize the contributions of others, Pines has nonetheless been described as "one of the towering scientists of this century". 
Throughout his career, Pines made significant contributions to the understanding of heterogeneous catalysis and the chemistry of petroleum hydrocarbons.

Ipatieff encouraged each person on his staff to  spend 10–15% of their time on a personal project, pleasing to their "chemical soul". Early on, Pines chose to test one of the dominant doctrines of the time: the belief that paraffin hydrocarbons or alkanes were inert substances that did not react with other substances at low temperatures. The very name paraffin reflected this belief, coming from the Latin "parum affinis" (limited affinity).

Pines was able to demonstrate that catalysis could occur at low temperatures, counter to previous belief. 
At low temperatures, in the presence of sulfuric acid (H2SO4), isoparaffins such as isobutane reacted with olefins. This alkylation process was discovered in 1932 and commercialized in 1938. 
 
Ipatieff and Pines were trying to understand complex chemical reactions that were affected by many factors including temperature, concentration of acid used, and ratio of acid to other compounds.
Such reactions often resulted in the formation of a complex mixture of products, including intermediate products which could participate in further reactions.

By working with pure hydrocarbons rather than petroleum fractions, Pines was better able to isolate and understand  specific chemical reactions.
He emphasized that a reaction was not understood until all the products of the reaction were identified and understood. His student Herbert Appel later recalled being taught, "never to be satisfied with a mechanism until it explains all the products".

Pines was able to understand and describe the isomerization of butanes and pentanes.  Isomerization is a rearrangement reaction, in which one molecule is transformed into another that contains the same atoms in a different arrangement.
Pines developed a method for the catalytic conversion of n-butane into isobutane. The first step was protonation of butene by sulfuric acid, forming a reactive but short-lived carbenium ion intermediate. The second step was alkylation of isobutane by the carbenium cations. 
Butane isomerization was discovered in 1935 and commercialized in 1941. 
Ongoing research into the chemical processes involved showed that it was impossible to achieve isomerization of paraffinic hydrocarbons without a chemical catalyst: heat alone could not be sufficient.
Pure n-butane would not react without a source of olefin cations.

The production of isobutane was a necessary step in the production of high-octane gasoline. The catalytic conversion of paraffins into isoparaffins has been described as "one of the cornerstones of the petroleum industry."
Combining the processes of alkylation and butane isomerization led to the development of high octane fuels for use in aviation gasoline.
Isobutane and C3–C4 olefins are by-products of fluid catalytic cracking and other catalytic and thermal conversion processes. 
During the alkylation process, light molecular weight iso-paraffins such as isobutane can be combined with C3–C4 olefins to form higher weight iso-paraffins or alkylates that do not contain olefinic or aromatic hydrocarbons.

 

These methods of preparation were kept secret by the Americans during World War II, but the fuels were made available to the Allies for their  Spitfires and Hurricanes, and are said to have given the Royal Air Force an advantage in the Battle of Britain. Another war-time accomplishment by Pines and his co-workers was the chemical analysis of the fuel of German aircraft. This enabled the Allies to target mines and other facilities that produced materials critical to the German war effort.
Alkylation processes have since been used to produce gasoline for motors, as engines became more powerful. Alkylation can be a preferable process for environmental reasons as well.

Having established that such reactions were possible, Pines and his co-workers explored the mechanisms involved in the catalysis of hydrocarbons. They studied a variety of transformations including "polymerization, alkylation, cyclization, additions, eliminations and hydride transfer reactions." 
They made basic discoveries that furthered the understanding of mechanisms involving carbonium ions, carbanions, free radicals, intermediates, thermal reactions, and relationships between catalytic behavior and surface chemistry. 
Pines studied both acid and base catalysis; catalytic properties of aluminas; and aromatization, dehydrogenation and metal hydrogenation catalysts.

He has contributed to understanding the mechanism of dehydration of alcohols on alumina as a catalyst and supporter.
He has also examined mechanisms of aromatization of alkanes over chromia.
He has analyzed hydrogen transfer reactions involving aromatic hydrocarbons. 
His work influenced Nobel winner George Andrew Olah, who was able to chemically stabilize carbocations and further investigate their structure and activity.

Pines and Ipatieff's discoveries about the catalysis of hydrocarbon reactions laid fundamental groundwork for the oil refining and chemical industries. These industries use various types of catalysts to unlock the saturated hydrocarbons in natural gas and raw oil. Processes involving noble-metal, liquid- and solid-acid catalysts are essential to the production of energy and of widely-used industrial chemicals in the twentieth century.
The work of Pines, Ipatieff, Louis Schmerling, Herman S. Bloch, Vladimir Haensel and others at Universal Oil Products (UOP)'s Riverside Laboratory has been recognized by the presentation of a National Historic Chemical Landmark at the laboratory building in McCook, Illinois, on November 15, 1995.

Pines was a founder of the Catalysis Club of Chicago. Since 1999, the Catalysis Club of Chicago and Honeywell-Universal Oil Products (UOP) have given an annual award, the Herman Pines Award, to recognize exceptional research in catalysis.

Awards
 1946: member of Alpha Gamma Chapter of Phi Lambda Upsilon (Honorary Chemical Society) on June 6, 1946
 1956: Ernest Guenther Award in the Chemistry of Natural Products (originally the Fritzsche Award) from the American Chemical Society
 1981: Eugene J. Houdry Award in Applied Catalysis
 1981: George A. Olah Award in Hydrocarbon or Petroleum Chemistry, from the American Chemical Society
 1982: Chemical Pioneer Award, from the American Institute of Chemists
 1983: E. V. Murphree Award in Industrial and Engineering Chemistry, from the American Chemical Society
 1995: Designation of the laboratory building in McCook, Illinois, as a National Historic Chemical Landmark  on November 15, 1995

Publications
Pines published at least 265 scientific publications. He held 145 U.S. patents. He co-edited Advances in Catalysis for more than twenty years.  He wrote three books:

Papers
Pines' papers are in the archives of Northwestern University.

References

1902 births
1996 deaths
20th-century American chemists
American chemical engineers
American people of Polish-Jewish descent
Polish emigrants to the United States
20th-century American inventors